Indira Gandhi Stadium is a cricket ground in Una, Himachal Pradesh, India.  The ground first held a first-class match in November 1986 when Himachal Pradesh played the Delhi in the 1986/87 Ranji Trophy.  The ground has held 21 further first-class matches, the last of which came in the 2001/02 Ranji Trophy when Himachal Pradesh and the Services.  The first List A match held on the ground came in the 1989/90 Deodhar Trophy when the Central Zone played the West Zone.  Himachal Pradesh first played a List A match there in 1993/94 Ranji Trophy one-day competition when the Services were the visiting team.  Between the 1993/94 season and the 2010/11 season, Himachal Pradesh have played nineteen List A fixtures there.

References

External links
Indira Gandhi Stadium, Una at ESPNcricinfo
Indira Gandhi Stadium, Una at CricketArchive

Cricket grounds in Himachal Pradesh
Monuments and memorials to Indira Gandhi
Una, Himachal Pradesh
Buildings and structures in Una district
1995 establishments in Himachal Pradesh
Sports venues completed in 1995
20th-century architecture in India